Windows App SDK (formerly known as Project Reunion) is a software development kit (SDK) from Microsoft that targets the development of native desktop applications on Windows 11 and Windows 10 back to version 1809.

Windows App SDK does not replace the Windows SDK; it is designed to enhance native Win32 (USER32/GDI32) and .NET 6 (WPF/WinForms) applications, and migrate existing UWP apps to Win32 or .NET model by providing a common application programming interface (API) based on UWP/WinRT and WinMD metadata, to bridge the gap between low-level system access in Win32 APIs and high-level programming concepts in .NET and UWP. Version 1.0 has been released in November 2021 after several developer preview releases.

Features and components

As of version 1.0, SDK components include WinUI 3, WebView 2, MSIX-Core, and C++/WinRT, Rust/WinRT and C#/WinRT language bindings. An API abstracting USER32/GDI32 primitives known as AppWindow was introduced to expose a unified set of windowing capabilities. The feature roadmap for version 1.1 includes "modern windowing" in WinUI 3, supporting multiple client windows and custom window controls. Additionally, enhancements for power management, push notifications, and app restart are planned.

There are plans to add  to the Windows App SDK.

See also
DWriteCore
Uno Platform
Windows Driver Kit (WDK)

References

External links

Free and open-source software
Microsoft development tools
Microsoft free software
Software development kits
Windows APIs
Windows-only free software